North Coast or Northcoast may refer to :

Antigua and Barbuda 
 Major Division of North Coast, a census division in Saint John Parish

Australia
New South Wales North Coast, a region

Canada
The British Columbia Coast, primarily the communities of Prince Rupert, Terrace and Kitimat and surrounding areas
North Coast Regional District, a regional district of British Columbia
North Coast (provincial electoral district), an electoral district in British Columbia comprising the North Coast region
Côte-Nord (North Coast), a rural region of Quebec east of Quebec City running along the north bank of the St. Lawrence River

Egypt
Northern coast of Egypt, a popular tourist resort

Kenya
The section of the Kenya coast to the north of Mombasa Island

India
Nothern part of coastal India

South Africa
KwaZulu-Natal North Coast, a part of the northern coast of the KwaZulu-Natal province

United States
North Coast (California), a region including Marin, Sonoma, Mendocino, Humboldt, and Del Norte counties, that is, the northern West Coast
North Coast AVA, an American Viticultural Area in California
North Coast Journal, an alternative weekly newspaper serving Humboldt County, California
Northcoast Marine Mammal Center, a California-based private non-profit organization
North Coast Brewing Company, a microbrewery in Fort Bragg, California
The Lake Erie portion within the Niagara Frontier, especially at the west end in Ohio
 North Coast Harbor in Cleveland
 Northcoast PCS, a former Independence, Ohio-based prepaid mobile phone operator
 North Coast Inland Trail, a trail in the northern part of Ohio
 North Coast Limited, an American passenger train connecting Chicago and Seattle
 New Hampshire Northcoast Corporation, a railroad operating part of the former Boston and Maine Railroad Conway Branch between Rollinsford and Ossipee
 North Coast (album)

See also 
 North Shore (disambiguation)